General elections were held in Vanuatu on 22 January 2016. The previous elections occurred in October 2012. The president of Vanuatu, Baldwin Lonsdale, dissolved the Parliament of Vanuatu in November 2015. This occurred after the conviction of 14 parliamentarians for bribery. The convicted MPs include former Prime Ministers Serge Vohor and Moana Carcasses Kalosil. The president called for a snap election to form a new government.

Background
Vanuatu has a unicameral parliament with 52 Members of Parliament. The people elect their members by voting for one candidate. In multi-member constituencies, Vanuatu uses the single non-transferable vote system and in single-member districts, first-past-the-post voting is used. Each parliamentarian holds office for a term of 4 years. In Vanuatu, there are eight single-member districts and nine multi-seat constituencies. The district magnitude of multi-seat constituencies has a range of two members to seven members for each constituency. Citizens elect the President of Vanuatu and the government elects the Prime Minister of Vanuatu.

Historically, the Vanuatuan government and society divided itself along linguistic lines. The Vanua'aku Party represented the Anglophone interests and the Union of Moderate Parties represented the Francophone interests. Over time the linguistic divide has diminished as Vanuatu established a stronger national identity post-independence. Party allegiances have become less strong as factions split and formed new political parties.

In recent years more than 30 parties have won seats in the Vanuatuan parliament. A ruling government needs to have a majority of parliamentarians to pass legislation and effectively rule. Consequently, coalitions are necessary to govern in Vanuatu. Coalitions often struggle to find a common legislative agenda to lead the nation which can be a cause of political instability. Following the 2012 Vanuatu election, there were five successive Cabinets of Vanuatu which were either formed after votes of no-confidence or after members had deserted the cabinet for the opposition.

Clientelism has been a problem in Vanuatuan politics since the country's independence in 1980. Often the lines between clientelism and corruption in Vanuatu have been ill-defined. The successful conviction of 14 MPs, including two former prime ministers, for bribery was one of the largest steps taken to combat corruption. The Supreme Court found that while in the opposition in 2014, former prime minister Moana Carcasses Kalosil bribed parliamentarians with 35 million vatu (US$300,000) to support a no-confidence motion. He then became deputy Prime Minister in Sato Kilman's Cabinet. The court convicted Carcasses and the other 13 parliamentarians, including the Speaker Marcellino Pipite, for offering and receiving bribes; they sentenced the MPs in November 2015 to three years in jail and banned them from public office for 10 years. As this verdict was delivered while President Lonsdale was out of the country, the speaker assumed the role of the president and issued pardons for all involved including himself. Lonsdale overturned the pardons when he returned to Vanuatu the following day. As several of the convicted parliamentarians were members of the Cabinet of Vanuatu, Prime Minister Sato Kilman was unable to effectively rule. Kilman was not able to form a new government -  nearly 1/3 of MPs were in jail - which led to governmental gridlock causing the Parliament to be dissolved by the president. The traditional chiefs of Vanuatu - the Malvatumauri - called for calm during this process and asked that the people allow for the legal process to unfold, suggesting that their power is mostly ceremonial and is limited politically. Following this failure to form a new government, Lonsdale called a snap election for 22 January 2016.

Campaign
The official campaign began on 5 January 2016. A total of 261 candidates contested the elections, including 68 independents and 193 representing 36 political parties. The convicted MPs were not permitted to run as one cannot run for office in Vanuatu if they have a criminal conviction. Candidates who could afford to pay for airtime dominated mainstream media during the campaign; social media played an important role in this election. Only 10 women contested seats in this election and youth engagement in the campaign and election appears to have increased from 2012 but remained low.

Conduct
Polls opened throughout the country on 22 January at 7:30AM and closed at 4:30PM. To facilitate high turnout levels, the government declared the day a public holiday. Schools, churches and other public centers transformed into polling stations. The Commonwealth and the Melanesian Spearhead Group observed the election to ensure electoral integrity.

Both groups of international observers remarked that turnout was low. The process of voting in Vanuatu works as follows: People who are 18 and above can vote if they have a voter card. The details are verified twice with the citizen then given an envelope with a sheet with the name, picture and political party symbol on a piece of paper. Each candidate had a different colored sticky paper attachment. In the voting booth, the voter identifies their preferred candidate, rips off the corresponding piece of paper and puts it into the envelope. The envelope is then dropped into a ballot box. The voter then retrieves their voter card and their thumb is inked. Voters are also able to proxy vote for two others while they cast their own vote.

The election day was peaceful and orderly. Voters headed to the polls early. Women and youth turned out to vote in high numbers. The conduct at polling stations did not vary around the country, suggesting relatively sufficient following of electoral rules.

After the polls closed at 4:30PM, the workers at the polling stations counted the ballots. As Vanuatu employs the first-past-the-post system and the single non-transferable vote system, the process of counting the votes was straightforward. Each candidate's number of votes were tallied and sent to the independently run Vanuatu Electoral Commission who announced the winners for each parliamentary seat.

The Electoral Integrity Project, an academic group that aims to quantify the integrity of elections worldwide, studied Vanuatu's 2016 election. By asking experts on Vanuatuan politics to rank the integrity of various electoral issues, the group found that the election was generally fair and just. However, they also suggest in their rankings that voters may have been bribed and that some may have received cash for votes. It was found likely that politicians offered patronage to voters, confirming at least some clientelism in Vanuatuan politics.

Results
As candidates only need to receive more votes than their competitor, all MPs were elected with 41% or less of the vote. All parties received less than 15% of the vote. The races were extremely tight – in the constituency of Paama, MP Fred William Tasso won his seat by seven votes. Multiple new political parties won seats in this Parliament and the percentage of votes roughly equaled the percentage of seats granted.

In the official results, the Melanesian Progressive Party obtained one seat at the Éfaté constituency; however, weeks later the Court ordered a recount of the ballots and awarded the disputed seat to the Land and Justice Party.

Aftermath
As there was not a clear majority of seats won by a single political party, parliamentarians from eight political parties and independent groups created a coalition to form a government. This coalition called for Charlot Salwai, a francophone, to be elected as Prime Minister on 11 February 2016. The opposition did not oppose this motion and Salwai was elected Prime Minister of Vanuatu by parliamentary vote. He declared his Cabinet the following day.

Subsequent by-elections

2016 Malo/Aore by-election
A by-election was called in June 2016 to elect an MP for the Malo/Aore constituency after the death of Havo Molisale. Uri Warawara of the Land and Justice Party defeated Bani Livo, an independent candidate.

2019 Efate Rural by-election
Caused by the death of incumbent MP Jerry Kanas (elected as an independent before joining Leaders Party of Vanuatu). Held on 2 September 2019, it resulted in a victory for Edwin Kalorisu of the Leaders Party.

See also
List of members of the Parliament of Vanuatu (2016–2020)

References

Vanuatu
General
Elections in Vanuatu
Vanuatu